Abacetus annamensis is a species of ground beetle in the subfamily Pterostichinae. It was described by Tikhon Chicherin in 1903 and is an endemic species found in Vietnam, Southeast Asia.

References

annamensis
Beetles described in 1903
Insects of Southeast Asia